Without Warning is a collaborative studio album by Atlanta-based rapper 21 Savage, American rapper Offset, and American record producer Metro Boomin. The album was released on October 31, 2017, by Slaughter Gang, Epic Records, Capitol Records, Motown, Quality Control Music, Boominati Worldwide, and Republic Records. It features guest appearances from Travis Scott and Quavo. Meanwhile, the album's production was handled primarily by Metro Boomin, alongside Bijan Amir, Cubeatz, Dre Moon, and Southside. Without Warning peaked at number four on the US Billboard 200, and received generally positive reviews from critics.

Background
On October 30, 2017, Epic Records announced Without Warning, along with the album's collaborators.

Promotion
"Ric Flair Drip" was serviced to rhythmic contemporary radio as the album's lead single on March 1, 2018. The song peaked at number 13 on the US Billboard Hot 100.

Critical reception

Without Warning was met with generally positive reviews. At Metacritic, which assigns a normalized rating out of 100 to reviews from mainstream publications, the album received an average score of 78, based on nine reviews. Aggregator AnyDecentMusic? gave it 7.4 out of 10, based on their assessment of the critical consensus.

Sheldon Pearce of Pitchfork praised the chemistry between the rappers, its Halloween aesthetic and Metro Boomin's production, stating: "It's short and cohesive, an enjoyable and uncomplicated 33 minutes of sheer exhilaration, filled with stings, itches, and cold chills. In one form or another, the collaboration comes as a surprise to all of us, arriving suddenly and carrying within the electricity and satisfaction of a good scare." Marshall Gu of Pretty Much Amazing said, "The best song comes early in "Ghostface Killers", with an excellent rapped chorus from Offset that's been running through my head since the tape dropped and Travis Scott sounding excellent as always even if he doesn't say much anything at all". Gary Suarez of Consequence said, "Where the Super Slimey too often felt like a requisite Xanax-blasted victory lap, one notably soft on hooks [...], Without Warning exudes vitality and menace". Online publication HotNewHipHop stated that Without Warning is "the rap equivalent of a slasher flick: gory, over-the-top, and a lot of fucking fun. Most of the horror vibe comes from Metro, who expertly throws in demented laughing, chainsaws, gunshots, wolf howls, creepy music boxes, and Rosemary's Baby-level haunting backing vocals as backing tracks to his instrumentals. And goddamn, those instrumentals. Big bells, eerie piano, reverby bass, and sci-fi synths set the tone, but the way he deploys them shows the most progress. There are no predictable build-ups, and the way he tailors the ins and outs of his beats to each rappers' flows and emphases is impeccable". Chris Gibbons of XXL said, "Without Warning is more than a Halloween novelty. Offset and 21 Savage turn their differences in delivery into an undeniable chemistry, while Metro Boomin's production gives the project a proper Halloween-inspired sound so their comparisons to classic villains like Freddy Krueger and Jason Voorhees aren't in vain".

Andrew Matson of Mass Appeal gave the album a favourable review, commenting: "It's a bit weird to joyfully toast an album that's so dark, and contains a lot of murder/guns talk. But what's most apparent here is two artists in love with their art, rapping from gangster/villain points of view. Both are experiencing crazy levels of success they might never have imagined, both are carving their own unique lanes through rap while staying true to their styles. It seems to have worked out naturally that they make music that can be extremely Halloween-ish, and that's the day we get Without Warning. What else can you say about why this project works? Sometimes shit lines up, and that's a beautiful thing." In a mixed review, HipHopDXs Trent Clark stated: "Like most projects that get recorded without the guise of a meticulous A&R, Without Warnings billing never exceeds the expectations of any artist—rapper or producer—let alone offer a glimpse of what allows these individuals to rank amongst 2017 Hip Hop's most popular figures."

Year-end lists

Commercial performance
Without Warning debuted at number four on the US Billboard 200 with 53,000 album-equivalent units, 11,000 of which were pure album sales. It is 21 Savage's second top 10 album, and Offset (as a solo artist) and Metro Boomin's first top 10 album. Six songs from the album managed to chart on the US Billboard Hot 100, led by "Ric Flair Drip", which peaked at number 13, becoming both Metro Boomin and Offset's highest charting song as lead artists.

Track listing

Personnel
Credits were adapted from Tidal.

Performers
 21 Savage – primary artist (tracks 1, 2, 4, 6–10)
 Offset – primary artist (tracks 1–3, 5–7, 9, 10)
 Travis Scott – featured artist (track 1)
 Quavo – featured artist (track 2)

Technical
 Ethan Stevans – mixing engineer (all tracks)
 Joe LaPorta – mastering engineer (all tracks)

Production
 Metro Boomin – producer (all tracks), primary artist (all tracks)
 Bijan Amir – producer (track 3)
 Cubeatz – producer (tracks 4, 9)
 Dre Moon – producer (track 6)
 Southside – producer (track 8)

Charts

Weekly charts

Year-end charts

Certifications

References

2017 albums
Metro Boomin albums
Offset (rapper) albums
Collaborative albums
Epic Records albums
Motown albums
Capitol Records albums
Republic Records albums
21 Savage albums
Quality Control Music albums
Albums produced by Metro Boomin
Albums produced by Southside (record producer)
Albums produced by Cubeatz